USP 800 Hazardous Drugs - Handling in Healthcare Settings is a chapter of a book which provides guidance about the handling of hazardous drugs (HDs) in the healthcare setting. It was created by the United States Pharmacopeia Convention. USP 800 was published on February 1, 2016 and originally planned for implementation in December, 2019, but implementation has been delayed.

Scope
USP 800 describes practice and quality standards for the handling of HDs involving but not limited to the receipt, storage, compounding, dispensing, administration, and disposal of sterile and non-sterile products. This chapter applies to any personnel who may be exposed to HDs. Personnel likely to be exposed may include pharmacists, pharmacy technicians, nurses, physician assistants, home healthcare workers, veterinarians, and veterinary technicians.

Requirements
Facilities that handle HDs must follow the standards outlined in USP 800. At minimum the facilities's management system must include:
 A list of HDs
 Facility and engineering controls
 Competent personnel
 Safe work practices
 Proper use of appropriate Personal Protective Equipment (PPE)
 Policies for HD waste segregation and disposal

List of hazardous drugs 
The National Institute for Occupational Safety and Health (NIOSH) maintains a list of antineoplastic and HDs that are used in healthcare settings. The site must maintain a list of any drugs they use that are on the NIOSH list and it must be updated every 12 months. If the facility begins using a new medication on the NIOSH list it must be added to their HD list.

Responsibilities of people handling hazardous drugs 
Each facility must have a designated person who develops, implements, and maintains USP 800 compliance. This person is also responsible for overseeing the training of personnel and reporting hazardous situations to the management team. All personnel who handle HDs must be trained on the fundamental practices and precautions to contain HDs.

Facilities and engineering controls 
HDs must be handled in ways to limit contamination. HD storage areas must be separated from break rooms and refreshment areas.
Designated areas must be available for:
 Receipt and unpacking
 Storage of HDs
 Non-sterile and sterile HD compounding

Receipt 
Antineoplastic HDs and all HD active pharmaceutical ingredients (APIs) must be unpacked in an area that is neutral/normal or negative pressure.

Storage 
HDs must be stored properly to prevent spillage or breakage. HDs should not be stored on the floor or areas prone to natural disaster such as earthquakes. 
Antineoplastic HDs that require further manipulation other than repackaging or counting must be stored separately from non-HDs. Sterile and non-sterile HDs must not be stored together. Refrigerated HDs must be stored in a dedicated refrigerator located in a negative pressure area.

References

External links
 USP Official Website
 USP 800 Download
 2019 NIOSH List of Dangerous Drugs

Pharmacy